Cesate railway station is a railway station in Italy. It serves the town of Cesate.

Services
Cesate is served by lines S1 and S3 of the Milan suburban railway network, operated by the Lombard railway company Trenord.

See also
 Milan suburban railway network

References

External links
 Ferrovienord official site - Garbagnate Milanese railway station 

Railway stations in Lombardy
Ferrovienord stations
Railway stations opened in 1955
Milan S Lines stations
1955 establishments in Italy
Railway stations in Italy opened in the 20th century